Music for Zen Meditation is a 1964 album by jazz clarinetist Tony Scott.

The album is considered to be the first new-age record. Music for Zen Meditation is mostly improvised by Scott, Shinichi Yuize (koto) and Hōzan Yamamoto (shakuhachi).

Sampling 
The fourth track entitled "After the Snow, the Fragrance" has been sampled by electronic artist Four Tet for his track entitled "Parks", which appeared on his 2001 release, Pause.

Track listing 
 "Is All Not One?" (Tony Scott, Hōzan Yamamoto, Shinichi Yuize) – 3:15
 "The Murmuring Sound of the Mountain Stream" (Scott, Yuize) – 8:05
 "A Quivering Leaf, Ask the Winds" (Yamamoto)– 2:30
 "After the Snow, the Fragrance" (Scott, Yuize) – 7:00
 "To Drift Like Clouds" (Yamamoto, Yuize) – 1:38
 "Za-Zen (Meditation)" (Scott, Yamamoto) – 2:05
 "Prajna-Paramita-Hridaya Sutra (Sutra Chant)" (Scott, Yuize) – 7:10
 "Sanzen (Moment of Truth)" (Scott, Yuize) – 6:45
 "Satori (Enlightenment)" (Scott, Yuize) – 5:25

Performance 
 Tony Scott - clarinet
 Shinichi Yuize - koto
 Hōzan Yamamoto - shakuhachi

See also 
 Meditation music
 1964 in music
 Instrumental music

References

External links
Official playlist on Tony Scott's YouTube channel

1964 debut albums
Tony Scott (musician) albums
Verve Records albums
New-age albums
Instrumental albums